Dénes Birkás, also known as Deján Bikár (13 March 1907 – 10 July 1996), was a Hungarian field hockey and ice hockey player who competed in the 1936 Summer Olympics.

He was born in Budapest.

He played at the 1930 and 1931 ice hockey World Championships. He would later coach the Hungarian national ice hockey team in 1959–1960.

In 1936 he was a member of the Hungarian team which was eliminated in the group stage of the Olympic tournament. He played all three matches as halfback.

External links
 
Dénes Birkás' profile at Sports Reference.com
Dénes Birkás' profile at the Hungarian Olympic Committee 

1907 births
1996 deaths
Hungarian male field hockey players
Hungarian ice hockey players
Olympic field hockey players of Hungary
Field hockey players at the 1936 Summer Olympics
Ice hockey people from Budapest